Vikramaditya (r. c. 884—911 AD or 920 AD)—better known as Vikramaditya "Varaguna"—was a monarch of the Ay dynasty of Kerala, south India. His surname indicates that he was a vassal or feudatory of the Pandya ruler Varaguna II (r.  862—885 AD). He was the immediate successor of Karunantatakkan "Srivallabha" (r. c. 856/57—884 AD), a vassal of Pandya king Srimara Srivallabha (r. 815—862 AD).

Vikramaditya Varaguna succeeded Karunanthadakkkan Srivallabha known for building and consecrating the Parthasarathy temple, Parthivapuram dedicated to Hindu deity Vishnu along with a Vedic salai (school) attached the temple. Vikramaditya married Aykula Mahadevi at this temple.

Vikramaditya is known for making a large land donation to a Buddhist vihara in central Kerala (Paliyam Copper Plates). This act of donation is considered as a symbol of friendly attitude towards the Chera/Perumal rulers of Kerala (after the fall of the Pandyas in the battle of Sripurambiyan in 885 AD).

Records of Vikramaditya Varaguna 

 Thirupparappu Plates
 Thirunandikkarai Plates
 Paliyam Copper Plates

Chitral inscription, dated to the 28th year of Vikramaditya Varaguna, says that Kunantangi Kurattikal, the disciple of Arattanemi Bhatara of Perayakkudi gifted some gold ornaments to the Bhatariyar of Tiruchanatu Malai. According to T. A. Gopinatha Rao, the inscription on the southern side says Gunandagi-kurattigal, the disciple of Arattanemi - Bhatariyar of Peravakkudi, presented Bhatariyar of Tiruchchanam malai with some golden ornament during the 28th year of reign of Vikramaditya Varaguna. There is much evidence and an established chronology about the Hindu monarch Vikramaditya of Ay dynasty, states T. A. Gopinatha Rao, and Vikramaditya's Chitral inscription helps date the Chitharal Jain Monuments and Hindu Bhagavati temple to the 9th-century. The inscription is Tamil language in Vatteluttu script.

Certain Varaguna - may be Vikramaditya - the disciple of Tirucharanattu Pattini Bhatarar appears as a donor in an inscription discovered from the temple of Tiruchanatu Malai in Chitral.

Paliyam Copper Plates 
The Paliyam Copper Plates name Varaguna, and do not mention Vikramaditya. There were several Varaguna in the history of South India. However, the Paliyam Plates include passages that mention the king to be from the Vrishni-kula and Yadava-vamsa, which helps identify Vikramaditya Varaguna as the likely source.

According to these plates, Vikramaditya made a donation of certain lands in the Ay country to the deity of Srimulavasa Buddhist vihara (somewhere in central Kerala, in the kingdom of the Chera/Perumals). The inscription is compiled in Tamil script (Tamil language) and Nagari script (Sanskrit).

 Paliyam Copper Plates open with three Sanskrit slokas in praise of Soudhodani (Buddha), Dharmasangha (Dharma) and Avalokitesvara.
 Describe Varaguna as the "Lord of Vizhinjam" and a member of the "Vrisni Race".
 Show arrangements made by the king - probably the Chera/Perumal king - to protect the plot handed over to the Srimulavasa vihara. It is tentatively concluded that the king had appointed Vira Kota, a member of the Chera/Perumal family, to protect the plot.
 Contain request to the king's descendants to "uphold dharma" and protect the land of donation
 Contain general appeal to all people to turn to "acts of benevolence".
 Tamil portions show the details - such as boundaries - of the plot donated

These plates are significant as they confirm that Buddhism was present and receiving land grants in the 9th-century in Tamil speaking regions of South India. Further the confirmation and use of Nagari script and Sanskrit in 9th-century South India is also notable.

Date of Paliyam Copper Plates 
The currently accepted date of the Paliyam Copper Plates was fixed by historian M. G. S. Narayanan.

Three dates are suitable for the astronomical data contained in the plates.

 868 AD - suggested by Gopinatha Rao - historically untenable.
 925 AD -  suggested by Elamkulam P. N. Kunjan Pillai - goes against the reference to the 15th regnal year.
 898 AD - Currently accepted date (M. G. S. Narayanan)

References

External links

9th-century Indian monarchs
10th-century Indian monarchs
People from Kerala
Chera dynasty